Hesami (also Romanized as Ḩesāmī) is a city in Sarchehan Rural District, Sarchehan District, Bavanat County, Fars Province, Iran. At the 2006 census, its population was 2,348, in 569 families.

References

External links 
 Official Website

Populated places in Sarchehan County
Cities in Fars Province